Grameen Foundation, founded as Grameen Foundation USA, also known as "GFUSA", is a global 501(c)(3) non-profit organization based in Washington, DC, that uses digital technology and data to understand very poor people, in detail, and offer them—and the entire ecosystem of agencies and actors surrounding them—empowering tools that meet and elevate their everyday realities.  Its CEO is Zubaida Bai.  Grameen Foundation's mission is, "To enable the poor, especially women, to create a world without poverty and hunger." According to the OECD, Grameen Foundation’s financing for 2019 development increased by 33% to US$45.5 million.

It is separate from organizations called "Grameen Foundation" in different countries, such as Grameen Foundation Australia.

History 
The Grameen Foundation was founded by author and independent consultant to nonprofit organizations Alex Counts in 1997. He established the foundation with $6,000 in seed funding from Muhammad Yunus. The mission was to facilitate the expansion of banks modeled after the Grameen Bank beyond the borders of Bangladesh and increase the access of poor people to microfinance by millions worldwide. After 18 years, he resigned from his position as president and CEO in 2015. He was replaced by former executive vice president for global programs David Edelstein.

Nobel-prize winner Professor Muhammad Yunus is founder and managing director of Grameen Bank, sat on the Board of Directors for 12 years and is now a director emeritus. Immediate past chairs of the board are Paul Maritz, formerly CEO of VMWare and formerly a senior executive at Microsoft, and Robert Eichfeld, a retired executive at Citibank. The current chair of the board is Peter Cowhey, the UC San Diego Interim Executive Vice Chancellor for Academic Affairs, Qualcomm Endowed Chair in Communications and Technology Policy, and the dean of the School of Global Policy and Strategy.

Programs 
Grameen Foundation leverages their expertise in digital technology and data to understand very poor people, especially women and girls, and offer them—and the entire ecosystem of agencies and actors surrounding them—tools that allow them to show up with their full power to end poverty and hunger.

Working with local and global allies, Grameen Foundation also develops and distributes mobile phone-based applications to help the poor to better manage:
 Their health, through such programs as the Mobile Technology for Community Health (MOTECH) initiative in Ghana
 Their crops, through such programs as the Community Knowledge Worker initiative in Uganda
 Their finances, though such programs as the Mobile Money initiative in Uganda

Grameen Foundation forayed into open source core banking systems by launching the website mifosx. The Mifos project was formally launched by Grameen Foundation in 2006.

References

Further reading
 Measuring the Impact of Microfinance: Taking Another Look; Kathleen Odell, June 2010.
 
 Measuring the Impact of Microfinance: Taking Stock of What We Know; Nathanael Goldberg, December 2005.
 Innovate podcast series interviews Alex Counts, founder and CEO of Grameen Foundation

External links
 Nokia, Grameen Collaborate for African Villages Highway Africa News Agency, November 25, 2005.

Foundations based in Washington, D.C.
Microfinance in North America
Non-profit organizations based in Washington, D.C.
Organizations established in 1997
International non-profit organizations